Axel Evert Taube (12 March 1890 – 31 January 1976) was a Swedish author, artist, composer and singer. He is widely regarded as one of Sweden's most respected musicians and the foremost troubadour of the Swedish ballad tradition in the 20th century.

Early life
Evert Taube was born in 1890 in Gothenburg, and brought up on the island of Vinga, Västergötland, where his father, Carl Gunnar Taube, a ship's captain, was the lighthouse keeper. His mother was Julia Sofia Jacobsdotter. Taube belongs to an untitled branch of the Baltic German noble Taube family, introduced at the Swedish House of Nobility in 1668 as noble family No. 734.

Career

Having spent two years (1907–1909) sailing around the Red Sea, Ceylon and South Africa, Taube began his career as a singer-songwriter and collector of sailors' songs, and on Christmas Eve 1908, on board the Norwegian ship SS Bergen headed for Spain, he performed "Turalleri, piken fra Hamburg".

Following a five-year stay (1910–1915) in Argentina, he developed an interest in Latin American music and introduced the Argentinian tango to Sweden in the twenties. Contrary to widespread perceptions, Taube did not work as a gaucho (cowboy) on the Pampas but as a foreman supervising workers who were digging canals designed to prevent flooding on the vast plains.

He is perhaps best known as a depictor of the idyllic, with motifs from the Swedish archipelagoes and from the Mediterranean, from a perspective every Swedish four-week holiday tourist could recognize. But he also wrote the most hard-hitting anti-fascist anti-war poem in the Swedish language, "Målaren och Maria Pia", about the Italian war in Abyssinia, from the late 30s. He also composed the anthem of the budding environmental movement in the 70s, "Änglamark" (originally written for the successful 1971 Hasse & Tage film The Apple War).

Taube's literary secretary Inga-Britt Fredholm was from late 1950s working as a secretary at the Park Avenue Hotel in Gothenburg. There, in 1962, Evert Taube met her and this led to her becoming his literary secretary for more than ten years. During the 1964–1965 period she undertook travel for work, along with Taube, going to the Antibes in France and to the Pampas in Argentina. She collaborated with Astri Taube on "Vid tiden för Astri och Apollon: okända dikter och berättelser", published in 1964.

During the 1960s Fredholm collected Evert Taube's stories and published them in eight volumes at Albert Bonniers Förlag under the shared title of "Samlade berättelser med tillhörande visor och ballader", released 1966–1967. In the 1970s she produced two pictorial biographies of Taube: ”När jag var en ung caballero: en bildbiografi" (1970) and ”Kom i min famn: Evert Taube 1920-1971 : en bildbiografi" (1972).

Among Taube's most famous songs are "Calle Schewens vals", "Min älskling (du är som en ros)", "Dans på Sunnanö", "Brevet Från Lillan", "Flickan i Havanna", "Änglamark", "Sjösala vals", "Fritiof och Carmencita", "Så skimrande var aldrig havet" and "Så länge skutan kan gå".

In 1976 he released an album of songs (on SR Records) about and by Sweden's 18th century bard, Carl Michael Bellman, performing 9 of Bellman's Fredman's Epistles including the ever popular Vila vid denna källa, Ulla! min Ulla! säj, får jag dig bjuda, and Solen glimmar blank och trind.

Taube has been translated into English by Helen Asbury, Paul Britten Austin, Emily Melcher and others. His songs have been recorded in English by Roger Whittaker, Sven-Bertil Taube, Martin Best, Roger Hinchliffe and Emily Melcher.

Personal life

In 1925, he married Astri Bergman Taube, a painter and sculptress.

Taube died in Stockholm and is buried on the churchyard of Maria Magdalena Church on Södermalm.

Taube had a summer house called Sjösala, located in Stavsnäs, which was burned down by Mona Wallén-Hjerpe in 1969.

Honors
On his 60th birthday in 1950, Taube received the Bellman Award from the Swedish Academy and in 1960 he received an honorary doctorate from Gothenburg University. He was elected as a member of the Royal Swedish Academy of Music in 1970.

Taube is regarded as one of the finest troubadours in Sweden. There is a complete pavilion, "Evert Taube's World" opened in 2008, dedicated to him at Liseberg Theme Park in Gothenburg.

On 25 March 2010, Norwegian Air Shuttle's (Norwegian.com) new Boeing 737-8FZ LN-NOV (msn 31713) was accepted at the Oslo (Gardermoen) base with the tail image of Evert Taube.

On 6 April 2011, the Bank of Sweden announced that Taube's portrait will feature on the 50 kronor banknote, beginning in 2014–15.

On 12 March 2013, a Google doodle was dedicated to him.

Children 
Per-Evert Arvid Joachim Taube (1926–2009)
Rose Marie Astrid Elisabet Taube (1928–1928)
Ellinor Gunnel Astri Elisabeth Taube (1930–1998)
Sven-Bertil Gunnar Evert Taube (1934-2022)

Publications 
 Sjösalaboken (1942), with illustrations by Roland Svensson.

Biography in English 
I Come From A Raging Sea 1967 
A History of Swedish Literature 1989 
A History of Swedish Literature 1996

See also 
List of Swedes in music
Swedish ballad tradition

Notes

References

External links 

Swedish
 
Taube society
Evert Taube discography
Evert Taube at Open Library.
Evert Taube homepage (unofficial)
English
Evert Taube biography
Evert Taube at AllMusic.
Translations
A Talk While Dancing
Sea Ballads and Other Songs
While still the boat sails along (Så länge skutan kan gå) 
The cheerful baker of San Remo (Den glade bagaren i San Remo)
Morning song at Baggensfjärden (Morgonsång på Baggensfjärden) 
Videos

1890 births
1976 deaths
Burials at Maria Magdalena Church
Swedish people of Baltic German descent
Swedish songwriters
Musicians from Gothenburg
Swedish male writers
20th-century Swedish male singers